Fernando Andrés Renz Boher (born 15 February 1994) is a Chilean field hockey player.

Personal life
Fernando Renz is the oldest of three brothers, with siblings Nicolás and Felipe also representing Chile.

Renz studied at the Universidad de Chile.

Career

Junior national teams

Under–18
Fernando Renz made his appearance for Chile in 2010, for the national U–18 team at the Pan American Youth Championship in Hermosillo. He followed this up with an appearance at the Youth Olympic Games in Singapore.

Under–21
In 2012 Renz made his debut for the Chilean U–21 team at the Pan American Junior Championship in Guadalajara, where he won a bronze medal.

Los Diablos
Fernando Renz made his debut for Los Diablos in 2014, during a test series against the United States in Chula Vista. 

In 2015 he won his first medal with the national team, winning bronze at the 2015 Pan American Games in Toronto. 

He won his first South American Games medal in 2018, taking silver at the tournament. In 2019, he was also a member of the national team at the 2019 Pan American Games in Lima. He also competed at the 2022 South American Games held in Asunción, Paraguay. He was one of the flag bearers for Chile during the opening ceremony of the 2022 South American Games.

References

External links

1994 births
Living people
Chilean male field hockey players
Sportspeople from Santiago
Field hockey players at the 2015 Pan American Games
Field hockey players at the 2019 Pan American Games
Pan American Games bronze medalists for Chile
Pan American Games medalists in field hockey
South American Games silver medalists for Chile
Competitors at the 2018 South American Games
Competitors at the 2022 South American Games
South American Games medalists in field hockey
Medalists at the 2015 Pan American Games
2023 Men's FIH Hockey World Cup players
21st-century Chilean people